Satava is a large island in the Archipelago Sea, off the coast of the city of Turku, Finland. The island is located between Hirvensalo and Kakskerta, and as with many Finnish islands, it has a large amount of summer residences. Satava is also a district of Turku, encompassing the island itself and some surrounding smaller islands, such as Kulho and Järvistensaari.

The current population of the district is 781, and it is increasing at an annual rate of 2.22%. 18.43% of the population are under 15 years old, while 15.75% are over 65. The district's linguistic makeup is 94.49% Finnish, 4.61% Swedish, and 0.90% other.

Satava was annexed to Turku in 1968 as a part of Kakskerta municipality.

See also
 Districts of Turku
 Districts of Turku by population

Districts of Turku
Finnish islands in the Baltic
Landforms of Southwest Finland